The 1970 Gent–Wevelgem was the 32nd edition of the Gent–Wevelgem cycle race and was held on 1 April 1970. The race started in Ghent and finished in Wevelgem. The race was won by Eddy Merckx of the Faemino–Faema team.

General classification

References

Gent–Wevelgem
1970 in road cycling
1970 in Belgian sport
April 1970 sports events in Europe